The Changping Line of the Beijing Subway is a rapid transit line in northern Beijing. It is colored pink in system maps.

Route
The Changping Line runs parallel, and to the east of, the Badaling Expressway, passing near Shahe and Nanshao.

Stations (North to South)
Service Routes:
 Regular: Changping Xishankou – 
 Short rush hour: Shahe Univ. Park – 
 Middle rush hour: Changping Dongguan – , with Beishaowa bypassed in the morning (○)
 Long rush hour (▲△):  → Changping Xishankou, with some trains bypassing Gonghuacheng; only available in the morning
 Some trains before or after rush hours, and near the last train:  → Zhuxinzhuang, then return to the Dingsilu Depot

Opening timeline
The line started construction in 2009. In September 2010, construction of Phase I was completed, and was followed by a three-month test run. Phase I of the line opened on December 30, 2010, and ran north from the Xi'erqi station on Line 13 to Nanshao station. It connects the central Changping District with the Beijing subway network.

On December 26, 2015, Phase II of the line opened, extending the line northwards to the Ming Tombs Scenic Area and terminating at Changping Xishankou station.

On December 31, 2021, the one-station extension to  opened. 

On February 4, 2023, the extension to  opened.

Future development

Through service with Line 8
Through service between Line 8 and Changping line via Zhuxinzhuang station is under planning.

South extension (section 1) to Jimenqiao
The southern extension to Jimenqiao station is 12.6 km in length, including a 0.36 km elevated section and a 12.24 km underground section. The extension will add 8 underground stations to the line. The one-station extension to  opened on December 31, 2021, and the section between Qinghe railway station and  opened on February 4, 2023, with 5 new stations. The opening date of  station and  station (interchange to Line 12) has not been announced yet.

South extension (section 2) to Xueyuannanlu
A further southern extension to Xueyuannanlu is planned. It will interchange with Line 9 and Line 13A at Xueyuannanlu station (formerly known as Mingguangqiaoxi station). This extension is still under planning and construction has not started.

History

The planned route of the Changping Line was chosen from three alternatives. The other original options placed the southern terminus of the line at the Beijing North railway station near Line 2 at Xizhimen, or at Huoying, with transfers to Line 8 and Line 13.

On January 5, 2009, the Changping District government signed land clearing contracts with townships along routes through Huilongguan, Shahe, and Nanshao, marking the official beginning of Phase I construction. Phase I was set to be completed by the end of 2010, and Phase II was scheduled for completion by 2012.

On September 19, 2010, the line commenced trial running with empty cars.

On December 30, 2010, Phase I of the line entered into operation.

On December 26, 2015, Phase II of the line entered into operation, extending the line north underground for another 5 stations.

On December 31, 2021, a one-station extension to  opened.

On February 4, 2023, the extension to  opened.

Ridership
During rush hours, in 2013, the section between Life Science Park and Xi'erqi Stations was the most congested section in the Beijing subway network, operating at 132% capacity.

Rolling Stock

References

External links 

 Map of an early route proposal for the Changping Line

Beijing Subway lines
Railway lines opened in 2010
2010 establishments in China
750 V DC railway electrification